The 2018–19 FIBA Europe Cup was the fourth season of the FIBA Europe Cup, a European professional basketball competition for clubs, that was launched by FIBA. The competition began on 20 September 2018, with the qualifying rounds, and concluded on 1 May 2019.

Dinamo Sassari won its first European title after beating s.Oliver Würzburg in the 2019 FIBA Europe Cup Finals.

Team allocation

Teams
The labels in the parentheses show how each team qualified for the place of its starting round:
1st, 2nd, 3rd, etc.: League position after eventual Playoffs
CL: Transferred from Champions League
RS: Fifth-placed and sixth-placed teams from regular season
QR: Losers from qualifying rounds

Round and draw dates
The draw will take place on the 31 July 2018 in the FIBA headquarters in Munich, Germany.
The schedule of the competition is as follows (all draws are held at the FIBA headquarters in Munich, Germany, unless stated otherwise):

Qualifying rounds
The draw for the qualifying rounds was held on 31 July 2018 at the FIBA headquarters in Munich, Germany.

In the qualifying rounds, teams are divided into seeded and unseeded teams based on their club coefficients, and then drawn into two-legged home-and-away ties. Teams from the same country cannot be drawn against each other.

First qualifying round
A total of 10 teams played in the first qualifying round. The first legs were played on 20 and 21 September, and the second legs were played on 26 September 2018.

|}

Second qualifying round
A total of 16 teams will play in the second qualifying round: 11 teams which enter in this round, and the 5 winners of the first qualifying round. The first legs were played on 3 October, and the second legs will be played on 10 October 2018.

|}
Notes

Lucky losers table
Three teams would advance as lucky losers of the qualifying rounds, for replacing teams that qualified for the Basketball Champions League regular season and previously confirmed their intention to join the FIBA Europe Cup if they were eliminated in the qualifying rounds. Teams with the smallest point difference in the second qualifying round advanced to the regular season. A draw to determine the groups for the clubs qualified as the best-ranked losing sides will be held in the FIBA Europe office in Munich on 11 October 2018.

Ranked third among the lucky losers, Den Bosch clipped the fourth-ranked Keravnos due to a higher number of points scored, with the teams tied in point differential.

Regular season

The draw for the regular season was held on 31 July 2018 at the FIBA headquarters in Munich, Germany.

The 32 teams are drawn into eight groups of four, a maximum of two clubs from the same country can be in the same group. In each group, teams play against each other home-and-away in a round-robin format. The group winners and runners-up advance to the second round, while the third-placed teams and fourth-placed teams are eliminated.

The following 10 teams chose the option of ending their continental adventure if they were eliminated from the Champions League qualifying rounds and therefore refuse to participate in the FIBA Europe Cup:

Opt-out clause teams
  Karhu
  Nanterre 92
  Dinamo Tbilisi
  Hapoel Tel Aviv
  Red October Cantù
  Šiauliai
  Polski Cukier Toruń
  Movistar Estudiantes
  UCAM Murcia
  Norrköping Dolphins

A total of 32 teams play in the regular season: the six teams directly qualified, the eight winners of the second qualifying round, the 15 of 23 losers of the 2018–19 Champions League qualifying rounds and three lucky losers of the second qualifying round.

Depending on the number of teams mentioned above that were eliminated from the Basketball Champions League qualifying rounds and with the aim to complete the 32 places in the regular season, the number of the defeated teams in the second qualifying round of the FIBA Europe Cup that advanced to the regular season were determined by the point difference recorded at the end of their pairings. In their draw, the first qualifying round was used for tie-breaking. In the draw persists, the next criterion was the performance of clubs in the last three seasons at the European competitions.

The match-days are on 17 October, 24 October, 31 October, 7 November, 14 November and 21 November 2018.

Turkish side Sakarya Büyükşehir and British side Leicester Riders played in their first European campaigns ever.

Group A

Group B

Group C

Group D

Group E

Group F

Group G

Group H

Second round
In each group, teams play against each other home-and-away in a round-robin format. The group winners and runners-up advance to the round of 16, while the third-placed teams and fourth-placed teams are eliminated.

A total of 16 teams play in the second round: the eight group winners and the eight runners-up of the regular season. The match-days will be on 12 December 2018, 19 December, 9 January, 23 January, 30 January and 6 February 2019.

Group I

Group J

Group K

Group L

Play-offs

Bracket

Round of 16
The first legs were played on 5–6 March, and the second legs on 12–13 March 2019.

Quarter-finals
The first legs were played on 20–21 March, and the second legs on 27–28 March 2019.

Semi-finals
The first legs were played on 10 April, and the second legs were played on 17 April 2019.

Finals

The first leg will be played on 24 April, and the second leg will be played on 1 May 2019.

See also
2018–19 EuroLeague
2018–19 EuroCup Basketball
2018–19 Basketball Champions League

References

External links
Official website

 
FIBA Europe Cup